Anne Roumanoff (born 25 September 1965 in Paris) is a French comedian and actress.

Early life
Anne Leila Roumanoff was born on 25 September 1965 in Paris, France. Her grandparents on one side were Ashkenazi Jews from Russia, and on the other side  Sepharadic Jews, from Morocco she is affiliated to Rabbi Haim Cohen of Fes.

Roumanoff attended her first theater school at the age of 12. She graduated from the Institut d'Etudes Politiques de Paris.

Career
Roumanoff started her career in the television program La Classe on France 3, alongside Fabrice, Lagaf' and Jean-Marie Bigard  in 1987. She became famous for her one-woman shows.

Roumanoff became part of the team of French TV show Rien à cirer on France Inter with Laurent Ruquier in 1991. In 1998, she celebrated her ten-year career at the Olympia.

In 2001, Roumanoff was the French voice of Coco la bouche in the animated feature Rugrats in Paris: The Movie. In 2003, her show Follement Roumanoff had a 13-month run at the Bobino Theater in Paris, then she started a tour in France and Quebec. In 2007, she celebrated her 20-year career with Anne a 20 ans at the Théâtre des Bouffes-Parisiens in Paris. From September 2007, she made a comic forum on the news, entitled On ne nous dit pas tout in the show Vivement Dimanche, hosted by Michel Drucker.

Personal life
Roumanoff has a husband and two daughters, Alice and Marie.

Filmography

Cinema
 1989 : La Passion de Bernadette, by Jean Delannoy
 1990 : Promotion canapé, by Didier Kaminka 
 1991 : Le Fils du Mékong, by François Leterrier
 1992 : Une journée chez ma mère, by Dominique Cheminal
 1995 : Golden Boy, by Jean Pierre Vergne
 2000 : Rugrats in Paris, by Stig Bergqvist

TV films
 1990 : Cavale, by Serge Meynard
 1991 : Vacances au purgatoire, by Marc Simenon
 1996 : Des mouettes dans la tête, by Bernard Malaterre
 1996 : Le censeur du lycée d'Épinal, by Marc Rivière
 1997 : Une patronne de charme, by Bernard Uzan
 2000 : Sa mère la pute, by Brigitte Rouan
 2005 : L'homme qui voulait passer à la télé, by Amar Arhab and Pascal Legitimus
 2005 : La famille Zapon, by Amar Arhab

Bibliography
 Ca va être ta fête Maman !, Hors Collection, 2005, Paris
 Le couple : Petits délices de la vie à deux, with Colette Roumanoff, Hors Collection, 2006, Paris
 Belle, mince, sexy : Et puis quoi encore ?, Hors Collection, 2006, Paris
 Portraits de femmes (et d'un homme), Fetjaine ed., Humour coll., 2007, Paris
 On ne nous dit pas tout !, "Les chroniques de Radio Bistrot", Fetjaine ed., Humour coll., 2009, Paris

Decorations 
 Globe de Cristal for Best One Man Show (2008)
 Officer of the Order of Arts and Letters (2015)

References

External links
  Official site
  MySpace
 

1965 births
Living people
Writers from Paris
Sciences Po alumni
French humorists
French stand-up comedians
20th-century French Jews
Officiers of the Ordre des Arts et des Lettres